Kurt Kuykendall is a retired American soccer goalkeeper who played professionally in the North American Soccer League.

Kuykendall attended American University, where he was a 1973 Honorable Mention (third team) All-American soccer player.  He was inducted into the American University Eagles Hall of Fame in 1996.  In 1974, the Washington Diplomats selected Kuykendall in the first round (second overall) of the North American Soccer League draft.  In 1975, he moved to the New York Cosmos for two seasons.  In 1978 while working as a real estate broker he made an appearance in an indoor match for the Diplomats giving up 7 goals in two periods of relief for the injured Eric Martin. He finished his professional career with one game with the Rochester Lancers in 1979 as a replacement goalkeeper when the NASL players went on strike.

All five of his children – Kris, Shawn, Jason, Jaime and Samantha – play soccer.

For the Glory, a feature film based on Kurt's career, is scheduled for release in 2011.

References

External links
 NASL career stats
 For the Glory

1952 births
Living people
American Eagles men's soccer players
American soccer players
American Soccer League (1933–1983) players
California Sunshine players
New York Cosmos players
North American Soccer League (1968–1984) players
North American Soccer League (1968–1984) indoor players
Rochester Lancers (1967–1980) players
Washington Diplomats (NASL) players
Association football goalkeepers